Bothriechis supraciliaris, commonly known as the blotched palm-pit viper, is a species of venomous snake in the subfamily Crotalinae of the family Viperidae. The species is endemic to southern pacific parts of Talamanca Mountain Range in Costa Rica and western Panama. No subspecies are recognized.

Description
Bothriechis supraciliaris is usually  in total length (including tail), but can reach . Its body colour varies. It can be either bluish-green, reddish-brown, or reddish-maroon, but usually it is bright-green or moss-green. The body is circular, ovoid and rhomboid in cross-section, with irregular dorsal blotches, that sometimes form crossbands. The belly is light. There are 21-23 dorsal scales rows at midbody. The head carries dark stripes and prominent scales that are located above the eyes. The only sexual dimorphism noted is that females of the species tend to be longer and thicker than males.

Geographic range
The geographic range of B. supraciliaris is limited to mountains near San Isidro del General, San Jose Province, Costa Rica.

Taxonomy
Bothriechis supraciliaris was formerly considered a subspecies of B. schlegelii, the eyelash palm-pitviper.

References

Further reading
Taylor EH. (1954). "Further Studies on the Serpents of Costa Rica". Univ. Kansas Sci. Bull. 36 (11): 673–800. (Bothrops schlegelii supraciliaris, new subspecies, pp. 791–794, Figure 39).

supraciliaris
Reptiles described in 1954
Endemic fauna of Costa Rica